The Mistral G-360-TS is a Swiss aircraft engine, designed and produced by Mistral Engines of Geneva for use in light aircraft.

By March 2018 the engine was no longer advertised on the company website and seems to be out of production.

Design and development
The engine is a three-rotor, 3X3X displacement, liquid-cooled, gasoline Wankel engine design, with a mechanical gearbox reduction drive with a reduction ratio of 2.82:1. It employs dual electronic ignition systems and produces  at 2250 rpm.

Specifications (G-360-TS)

See also

References

External links

Mistral aircraft engines
Pistonless rotary engine